TaharQa Z. Aleem (born February 14, 1946) and Tunde Ra Aleem (February 14, 1946 – August 14, 2014) were formerly known as Albert and Arthur Allen. Although they wore many hats, they are most notable for being American musicians, producers, authors, and entrepreneurs originally based out of Harlem, NY, in addition to being close friends and musical collaborators with Jimi Hendrix.

They also founded NIA Records, which launched their groundbreaking club/dance hits "Hooked on Your Love" and "Release Yourself". This same independent record label would also be pivotal in kick-starting the careers of several legendary hip-hop artists, namely Marley Marl and the Wu-Tang Clan. After the death of his twin Tunde Ra in 2014, TaharQa still continues to be active in humanitarian efforts through his Hip-Hop for Humanity organization.

Early life
TaharQa (Albert Raymond Allen) and Tunde Ra (Arthur Russell Allen) Aleem were born in Harlem New York on February 14, 1946, to William Austin Allen and Dorothy Phoenix. The twins were inseparable growing up and got a first-class musical education on the streets of Harlem, namely the world-famous Apollo theater. Those rich cultural experiences of seeing the world's greatest R&B/soul acts along with the musical talents of their mother Dorothy, propelled the Allen twins to pursue music in various singing groups. It was one of Harlem's most notorious gangsters and entrepreneurs, Jack "Fat Man" Taylor, who gave the twins their first break, as he signed their group, the International GTO's to his independent record label, Rojac Records. The GTO's never made it big on Rojac Records, but they had the opportunity to learn how to run an independent record label. This on the job training would prove to be most valuable later in life. During their time at Rojac Records, the twins had the opportunity to rub elbows with talented and creative people like Clarence “Blowfly” Reid, who was an in-house writer and producer for Rojac Records. It was also through Fat Man that the twins would meet Lithofayne (Faye) Pridgeon, a close friend and love interest of Jimi Hendrix. Originally, it was Faye's intention to use Arthur (Tunde Ra) to evict Jimi Hendrix from the apartment of her friend June Vasquenza (Maria Gurrero/Pantera) by convincing Arthur to marry June to rectify her status as an illegal alien from Mexico. Instead of kicking Jimi out, the twins bonded immediately with him over their shared passion of music. The Allen twins became lifelong friends with Jimi for the duration of his life, both before and after his rise to the top of the music world, even recording with him several times.

Friendship and musical collaboration with Jimi Hendrix
The twins befriended Jimi Hendrix before he went to Europe and became a superstar. To keep himself grounded, Jimi always made it his business to stay connected with his friends from Harlem upon his return to the States, even as one of rock's largest luminaries. Jimi's friendship with the twins would eventually lead to musical collaborations. The twins, musically known as the Ghetto Fighters (a name suggested by Hendrix), would record background vocals on Jimi's songs like Dolly Dagger, Freedom, Stepping Stone and Izabella. Jimi also lent his progressive electric guitar skills to a song the twins recorded in June 1969 at Fame Studios in Muscle Shoals, Alabama called Mojo Man. Jimi overdubbed his guitar parts later in August 1970 at Electric Lady Studios. This was all part of a larger plan for Jimi to help the twins produce the Ghetto Fighters album, which he called a “street opera.”

The twins were featured as background vocalists on at least four (not counting compilations and reissues) Jimi Hendrix posthumous albums: Cry of Love (1971 - Platinum), Rainbow Bridge (1971 - Gold), War Heroes (1972), First Rays of the New Rising Sun (1997), and People, Hell and Angels (2013). They were also featured on Experience Hendrix: The Best of Jimi Hendrix (1997 - Double Platinum), The Jimi Hendrix Experience (Purple Box Set) (2000 - Platinum), and Voodoo Child: The Jimi Hendrix Collection (2001 - Gold).

Harlem Street Fair (Benefit for UBA) Sept. 5, 1969
The twins wanted to promote a Harlem concert to showcase Jimi to the Black community. Jimi in turn, wanted to show his appreciation to the genesis of his New York musical roots. The original plan was for Jimi to do the benefit concert for the humanitarian crisis in Biafra (Nigeria) at the Apollo, but the owner, George Schiffman declined the offer. Instead, plans were made to perform an outdoor benefit concert for the United Block Association (UBA) on the corner of Lenox Avenue and 139th St. Before the concert took place on September 5, 1969, Jimi made the big announcement at a September 3 televised press conference at Frank's Restaurant in Harlem. Unfortunately, most of the reporters were more interested in asking questions about his legendary performance at Woodstock, which occurred less than a month earlier in August.

The benefit concert was supported by artists on Fat Man's Rojac Records. Artists like Big Maybelle, Chuck-a-Luck, and LTD, with a young Jeffrey Osborne on drums, warmed the Harlem crowd up for the big finale of Jimi Hendrix, Billy Cox, Jerry Velez, Mitch Mitchell, and Larry Lee. This was the same lineup that Jimi used at Woodstock, called Gypsy, Sun and Rainbows. The concert was set to be filmed professionally, but the person that was paid to film the concert didn't realize how big of a star Jimi was and ran out of film in the process of recording the other acts. This left only a few seconds of film before Jimi began his set. All that remains of that historic night are seconds of a video of Jimi plugging into his amps, pictures taken by few professional photographers, and a horrible distorted audio recording that's barely audible.

By most eyewitness accounts, the Harlem crowd was slow to warm up to Jimi, with someone even throwing an object on stage. Once Jimi got into his performance, he won the crowd over and put on a great show.

NIA Records
In 1972, with their friend Jimi Hendrix deceased, the Ghetto Fighters changed their musical group's name to US, then Prana People. The group consisted of the twins, their sister Juliette and Tommy Lockhart. They were managed and financed by New York Knicks legend Earl “The Pearl” Monroe. The group released a self-titled album on Prelude Records in 1977

After the Prana People album, the twins decided to go in a new musical direction, producing the song "Hooked on Your Love" in 1979. The song featured Leroy Burgess on lead vocals, formerly of the R&B group Black Ivory. Rounding out the background vocals were Jocelyn Brown, Crystal Davis, and a young Luther Vandross. The song would go on to become a club classic and usher in the early transitional phase from disco to club/dance music in NYC. The song peaked at #15 and spent 16 weeks on Billboard's Dance charts.

At this point, the twins had grown weary of the traditional “shop your demo” approach and opted to go the independent route. They borrowed 1500 dollars from their father, pressed their own records and started NIA Records in 1979 in order to distribute their single. Author Dan Charnas recalls the early business of rap in his book, The Big Payback. The Aleems and Nia Records play a prominent role, as they were responsible for some of rap's seminal MC's.

Impact on hip-hop
The twins were starting to get hip to the young fledgling hip-hop scene due to the prodding of Fat Man, whose Harlem World club became a rite of passage for many up and coming hip-hop artists. The Sugar Hill Gang was discovered at Harlem World by Joe and Sylvia Robinson of Sugar Hill Records. Fat Man also suggested that the twins take their instrumental for their club hit Hooked on Your Love and use it as a backing track for a group called Dr. Jeckyll & Mr. Hyde (Andre Harrell and Alonzo Brown). The demo resulted in a production deal for the Dr. Jeckyll & Mr. Hyde with Profile Records.

The twins’ next single on NIA Records, Release Yourself, was an even bigger hit than their first single, thanks to the hip-hop styled remix by Marley Marl in 1984. The suggestion of this remix was made by Mr. Magic, whose WBLS show, Mr. Magic's Rap Attack, was just beginning to take NY urban radio into its hip-hop era. NIA records would also distribute songs from Captain Rock, The Last Poet (Abiodun Oyewole), Sparky D’s answer record to Roxanne (Sparky’s Turn), Marley Marl featuring MC Shan on Marley Marl’s Scratch, and the Super Kids featuring a young Craig G, Prince A.D., and Tragedy Khadafi (The Intelligent Hoodlum).

Atlantic Records
The Aleems continued to put out hot dance hits on 12-inch singles like 1985's Confusion and its subsequent remix in 1986, both featured vocals from Black Ivory lead vocalist, Leroy Burgess. The hot streak of The Fantastic Aleems and NIA Records caught the eye of Atlantic Records and they offered the twins a recording deal. This prompted a name change to Aleem. While working on their debut Top 50 R&B 1986 album for Atlantic called Casually Formal, they contracted the services of Maurice Starr, which would prove to be a fruitful relationship when his new group, New Kids on the Block suddenly took off like his former group New Edition did. Maurice allowed the twins to produce and write a song on the New Kids’ fourth album, Step by Step entitled, Never Gonna Fall in Love Again. The album went triple platinum in the US and sold over 7 million copies worldwide. The twins would go on to produce one more album for Atlantic in 1987 called Shock. Both Atlantic albums would feature Leroy Burgess on lead vocals.

Konkrete Studios and the Wu-Tang Clan
During the '90s, the twins stepped back from recording as artists and decided to open Konkrete Recording Studios in Mid-town Manhattan and also started B.I.D. (Black Independent Distribution), to promote and distribute records. This allowed them the chance to work with an array of talented artists like Rick James, Kashif, Technotronic, and the Wu-Tang Clan.

The twins helped the Wu-Tang Clan distribute their first single Protect Ya Neck in New York and helped them get signed to LOUD Records. In addition, the twins recorded some of the songs that would appear on Wu-Tang's classic debut album, Enter the Wu-Tang (36 Chambers) at Konkrete Studios. This collaboration led to the twins working with the Gravediggaz, which featured Prince Paul, Frukwan, Poetic, and Wu-Tang Clan front man and producer RZA.

Organizational affiliations
The twins founded the ROBC (The Reconstruction of Black Civilization), which was designed to bring attention to the royalty that exists in people of African heritage. To demonstrate their mission, the organization sponsored a trip to the U.S. for the son of Emperor Halie Selassie I of Ethiopia, along with several members of the Ethiopian Royal Family.

The twins also founded Hip-Hop for Humanity on September 11, 2001. The goal of HHFH is to assist musically inclined youth by educating them to embrace leadership roles, take responsibility as future leaders, and put this knowledge to use by engaging in positive actions in their community and the world.

The Aleems have also served as advisers and directors of the Hendrix Foundation.

Unfinished Ghetto Fighter album and other catalog
Before their friend Jimi Hendrix died, he was planning on working with the twins on their Ghetto Fighter album. The songs Mojo Man and Jet Set were intended to be on that album. When Jimi died on September 18, 1970, the twins shelved this album for over 40 years. They finally resurrected it and polished up the song Mojo Man with additional vocals from Leroy Burgess. The original version of Mojo Man appeared on a posthumous Hendrix album called People, Hell and Angels in 2013. To go along with the twins’ version of Mojo Man, they included an animated cartoon as a part of their Urban Street Tales series. The twins opened up their vault and began to make their past catalog available to the public, including a song called Sugar Daddy, featuring James Booker on piano, Buddy Miles on vocals and Jimi Hendrix on guitar.

The Allen brothers wrote the song Mojo Man" for the posthumous Jimi Hendrix album "People, Hell and Angels."

Books
In addition to their musical catalog, the twins authored several books, including a joint memoir about their lives originally published in 2014. This auto-biography, Jimi Hendrix & The Ghetto Fighters: In Harlem World, traces the path of the twins from Harlem hustlers, to befriending Hendrix, to musical pioneers, to respected elders. The book is very candid in the portrayal of the many flaws and personal demons that plagued the twins throughout their lives.

Other books include The 66 Attributes of the Nigger, Sacred Formulas – To Raise the Royal Mind and the soon to be released musical-mythology, Jimi Hendrix and the World of the Mu.

Films and soundtracks
The Aleems, known then as the Allen twins stole the show in the 1973 documentary about Jimi Hendrix (a film about Jimi Hendrix). Their memorable interviews shed light on what it was like to be friends with one of the greatest musical talents the world has ever known

The Aleems were also featured as actors. As they played themselves in the 1994 comedy, Twin Sitters, starring the Barbarian Brothers (Peter and David Paul).

The Aleems were also involved in two film soundtracks - 1988's I'm Gonna Git You Sucka: Two Can Play the Game (producers’ credit) and 1994's Twin Sitters: Watcha Lookin' At (writers’ and producers’ credit)

Death of Tunde Ra Aleem
On August 14, 2014, Tunde Ra Aleem ended his physical existence on earth, as he finally succumbed to his lengthy bout with idiopathic pulmonary fibrosis, a rare and terminal disease that affects the lungs’ bronchi, preventing oxygen from being absorbed. Defying the original prognosis in 2006, which only gave Tunde Ra 3–4 months to live, he was able to live eight more productive and lively years. During this time, he completed three books and three albums.

Legacy

The Aleems will always be remembered as not only friends of Jimi Hendrix, pre-fame/post-fame, but also as life-long hustlers, who made pioneering moves in the independent record business and early club/dance and hip-hop music. Their entrepreneurial spirit pre-dated the Too Short, Master P, Cash Money and hip-hop independent record label CEO era, which saw hip-hop artists control their own destiny by moving units themselves. The Aleems were privileged to witness the early beginnings of hip-hop when Jimi Hendrix, Lightnin’ Rod and Buddy Miles combined to produce the proto-rap masterpiece, Doriella Du Fontaine in 1969. They parlayed these experiences and life lessons into a successful musical career that spanned two decades. Not only did they break new ground in club/dance music, but they also were involved in bridging the gap between hip-hop and R&B (Marley Marl re-mix of Release Yourself) and sponsoring, nurturing, and recording the up-and-coming rap artists of the '80s and '90s.

In 2016, the Aleems had to sue  Experience Hendrix L.L.C., Rainbow Guitars, Inc., Harvey Moltz, and the Rock & Roll Hall of Fame & Music, to get back two guitars that Jimi Hendrix gave the Allen twins, a Black Widow and doubleneck Mosirite. They were unsuccessful in their initial attempt and are currently appealing the decision. These guitars are currently on display at the Rock and Roll museum in Cleveland, Ohio

Chart history
The Fantastic Aleems

Billboard Dance/Club Single

Peak Date- (06/21/1980) Hooked on your Love - Peaked at #15 (16 weeks on the charts)

Aleem

Billboard Singles - R&B

Peak Date- (09/29/1984) Release Yourself - Peaked at #83 (6 weeks on the charts)
Peak Date- (05/03/1986) Loves on Fire - Peaked at #23 (13 weeks on the charts)
Peak Date- (07/12/1986) Fine Young Tender - Peaked at #62 (7 weeks on the charts)
Peak Date- (10/10/1987) Love Shock - Peaked at #51 (11 weeks on the charts)

Billboard Singles - Dance/Club

Peak Date- (09/01/1984) Release Yourself - Peaked at #23 (16 weeks on the charts)
Peak Date- (04/26/1986) Loves on Fire - Peaked at #16 (7 weeks on the charts)

Billboard Album - R&B

Peak Date-(05/17/1986) Casually Formal - Peaked at #45 (8 weeks on the charts)

Discography

AllMusic

Soul Years

Singles that charted

References
 https://stevenstancell.com/blog/blog/jimi-hendrix-to-wu-tang-clan-to-jimi-hendrix-the-aleems-come-full-circle

External links
 The official site of The Ghetto Fighters
 Hip-Hop for Humanity
 (Discography for Aleem)

1946 births
Twin musical duos
Musicians from New York City
Living people